Zayed Al Nahyan is an Arabic name, may refer to:
Zayed bin Khalifa Al Nahyan (1840–1909), ruler of Abu Dhabi 
Zayed bin Sultan Al Nahyan (1918–2004), Zayed bin Khalifa grandson, ruler of Abu Dhabi, founder and first president of United Arab Emirates